Tmesiphantes is a genus of Brazilian tarantulas in the subfamily Theraphosinae that was first described by Eugène Louis Simon in 1892. The genera Magulla and  Melloleitaoina were brought into synonymy in 2019.

Species
 it contains the following species, found in Brazil and Argentina:
Tmesiphantes amadoi Yamamoto, Lucas, Guadanucci & Indicatti, 2007 – Brazil
Tmesiphantes amazonicus Fabiano-da-Silva, Guadanucci & DaSilva, 2019 – Brazil
Tmesiphantes aridai Gonzalez-Filho, Brescovit & Lucas, 2014 – Brazil
Tmesiphantes bethaniae Yamamoto, Lucas, Guadanucci & Indicatti, 2007 – Brazil
Tmesiphantes brescoviti (Indicatti, Lucas, Guadanucci & Yamamoto, 2008) – Brazil
Tmesiphantes buecherli (Indicatti, Lucas, Guadanucci & Yamamoto, 2008) – Brazil
Tmesiphantes caymmii Yamamoto, Lucas, Guadanucci & Indicatti, 2007 – Brazil
Tmesiphantes crassifemur (Gerschman & Schiapelli, 1960) – Argentina
Tmesiphantes guayarus Fabiano-da-Silva, Guadanucci & DaSilva, 2019 – Brazil
Tmesiphantes hypogeus Bertani, Bichuette & Pedroso, 2013 – Brazil
Tmesiphantes janeira (Keyserling, 1891) – Brazil
Tmesiphantes mirim Fabiano-da-Silva, Guadanucci & DaSilva, 2015 – Brazil
Tmesiphantes mutquina (Perafán & Pérez-Miles, 2014) – Argentina
Tmesiphantes nordestinus Fabiano-da-Silva, Guadanucci & DaSilva, 2019 – Brazil
Tmesiphantes nubilus Simon, 1892 (type species) – Brazil
Tmesiphantes obesus (Simon, 1892) – Brazil
Tmesiphantes perp Guadanucci & Silva, 2012 – Brazil
Tmesiphantes raulseixasi Fabiano-da-Silva, Guadanucci & DaSilva, 2019 – Brazil
Tmesiphantes riopretano Guadanucci & Silva, 2012 – Brazil
Tmesiphantes uru (Perafán & Pérez-Miles, 2014) – Argentina
Tmesiphantes yupanqui (Perafán & Pérez-Miles, 2014) – Argentina

Formerly included:
T. elegans Gerschman & Schiapelli, 1958 (Transferred to Homoeomma)
T. serratus Gerschman & Schiapelli, 1958 (Transferred to Homoeomma)
T. spinopalpus Schaefer, 1996 (Transferred to Cyclosternum)

Nomen dubium
T. chickeringi Caporiacco, 1955

See also
 List of Theraphosidae species

References

Theraphosidae genera
Spiders of Brazil
Theraphosidae